was a Japanese actor. He died of pneumonia in 2011.

References

1943 births
2011 deaths
Male actors from Tokyo
Japanese male film actors
Japanese male television actors
Deaths from pneumonia in Japan